The Treeing Feist is a  breed of feist from the Southeastern United States. Originally considered a single breed, the Mountain Feist is now considered a separate breed with both being separately recognized by the United Kennel Club.

History
In the 19th century a small type of dog developed in the mountainous regions of the Southeastern United States.  Used to hunt small game, these dogs were bred from terriers and hounds. These dogs became known as the Treeing Feist; feist is a derivation of fist and is a term used in Southern America for a small fierce dog.  The word treeing refers to their hunting style of running game up into trees and indicating to the hunter which tree the game has climbed. Both the Treeing and Mountain Feist breeds are used to hunt small game, particularly squirrel and rodents, as well as raccoons, opossums, rabbits and for flushing birds.

In the 20th century these dogs became increasingly rare and in the early 1980s a group of devotees banded together to prevent their extinction. In 1984 the Mountain Feist Association was formed; in 1985 this was replaced by the American Treeing Feist Association, and this was joined by the Mountain Feist Breeder's Club in 1986, the Mountain Treeing Feist Organization in 1992 and the Traditional Treeing Feist Club in 1999. In 1998 the United Kennel Club recognized the Treeing Feist as a breed, in 2015 they recognized the Mountain Feist as a separate breed.

Description
Both breeds are described as small, active, alert dogs; they have short, dense coats that can be found in any color, combination of colors or color patterns. They usually have pricked ears although semi-pricked ears are common and their tails can be docked at any length or left intact.

See also
 Dogs portal
 List of dog breeds

References

Dog breeds originating in the United States